Dana Cirque is a cirque,  wide, lying east of Conrad Ledge in The Fortress, Cruzen Range, Victoria Land. Named by the Advisory Committee on Antarctic Names in 2005 after Gayle L. Dana, Biological Research Center, Desert Research Institute in Reno, NV; and a team member of the United States Antarctic Program McMurdo Dry Valleys ecological research for five seasons, from 1993 to 2001.

References

Landforms of Victoria Land